Paracles tenuis is a moth of the subfamily Arctiinae first described by Carlos Berg in 1877. It is found in Argentina, Uruguay and Colombia.

References

Moths described in 1877
Paracles